Fractal Notes and Shoe Throats is an emo, rock album written and performed by Positive Infinity. The album was released on November 16, 2005.

Track listing
Music written by Jonathan Roberts
All lyrics written by Jonathan Roberts

"Truth (The Smoking Gun)"   – 3:04
"Avatar"  – 2:30
"Being Thorough is Dangerous"  – 3:26
"Wheel (Reinventing Practicality)"  – 4:22
"Leaving Thorns on Roses"  – 11:51
"Smiles Can't Vivify a Soul"  – 2:56
"Thus Far and no Further"  – 0:44
"Broken Reels"  – 8:32

Band line-up
Jonathan Roberts – Guitar/Bass/Lead Vocals/Mixing
Jah Wobble - Percussion/Bass/Mixing
David Ayers - Acoustic Guitar

Additional credits
Produced by Jonathan Roberts
Jah Wobble and David Ayers provided material for "Avatar" and "Broken Reels".

2005 debut albums
Positive Infinity albums